Wilberforce Talel (born 10 January 1980 in Marakwet District) is runner from Kenya. He is a Commonwealth Games gold medalist and has competed several times at the IAAF World Cross Country Championships. He is the current 10,000 metres Commonwealth Games record holder.

International competitions

Personal bests

See also
List of Commonwealth Games medallists in athletics (men)

External links

Posso Sports profile

1980 births
Living people
Kenyan male long-distance runners
Kenyan male cross country runners
Commonwealth Games gold medallists for Kenya
Commonwealth Games medallists in athletics
Athletes (track and field) at the 2002 Commonwealth Games
Medallists at the 2002 Commonwealth Games